20 Let Oktyabrya is a rural locality (a khutor) in Ivanchikovsky Selsoviet Rural Settlement, Lgovsky District, Kursk Oblast, Russia. Population:

Geography 
The khutor is located 57 km from the Russia–Ukraine border, 57 km west of Kursk, 8 km north-east of the district center – the town Lgov, 4 km from the selsoviet center – Ivanchikovo.

 Climate
20 Let Oktyabrya has a warm-summer humid continental climate (Dfb in the Köppen climate classification).

Transport 
20 Let Oktyabrya is located 10 km from the road of regional importance  (Kursk – Lgov – Rylsk – border with Ukraine) as part of the European route E38, 5.5 km from the road  (Lgov – Konyshyovka), 15 km from the road of intermunicipal significance  (38K-017 – Nikolayevka – Shirkovo), 5 km from the road  (38K-023 – Olshanka – Marmyzhi – 38N-362), 8 km from the nearest railway station Sherekino (railway line Navlya – Lgov-Kiyevsky).

The rural locality is situated 64 km from Kursk Vostochny Airport, 145 km from Belgorod International Airport and 267 km from Voronezh Peter the Great Airport.

References

Notes

Sources

Rural localities in Lgovsky District